The 1921 Cal Poly Mustangs football team represented California Polytechnic School—now known as California Polytechnic State University, San Luis Obispo—as an independent during the 1921 college football season. Led by first-year head coach Al Agosti, Cal Poly compiled a record of 3–2–1 outscored their opponents 107 to 48.

Cal Poly was a two-year school until 1941.

Schedule

References

Cal Poly
Cal Poly Mustangs football seasons
Cal Poly Mustangs football